The 1979 Giro d'Italia was the 62nd running of the Giro, one of cycling's Grand Tours. It started in Florence, on 17 May, with an  prologue and concluded in Milan, on 6 June, with a  individual time trial. A total of 130 riders from thirteen teams entered the 19-stage race, that was won by Italian Giuseppe Saronni of the Scic-Bottecchia team. The second and third places were taken by Italian Francesco Moser and Swede Bernt Johansson, respectively.

In addition to the general classification, Saronni won the points classification, Amongst the other classifications that the race awarded, Claudio Bortolotto of Sanson Gelati-Luxor TV won the mountains classification, and Bianchi-Faema's Silvano Contini completed the Giro as the best rider aged 24 or under in the general classification, finishing fifth overall. Sanson Gelati-Luxor TV finishing as the winners of the team classification, ranking each of the twenty teams contesting the race by lowest cumulative time.

Teams

Thirteen of the fourteen teams invited to the 1979 Giro d'Italia participated in the race. Kas were forced to decline their invitation, in favor of racing the Vuelta a España, by the Spanish Federation which wanted the "best Hispanic" peloton to be competing in Vuelta that year. Each team sent a squad of ten riders, which meant that the race started with a peloton of 130 cyclists. From the riders that began this edition, 111 made it to the finish in Milan.

The teams entering the race were:

Pre-race favorites

The starting peloton did include the 1978 winner, Johan De Muynck. Successful French rider Bernard Hinault did not enter the race.

Route and stages

The route was unveiled on 22 March 1979. The organizers chose to include two rest days. When compared to the previous year's race, the race was  shorter and contained one more time trial. In addition, this race contained one less stage.

Classification leadership

There were four main individual classifications contested in the 1979 Giro d'Italia, as well as a team competition. Four of them awarded jerseys to their leaders. The general classification was the most important and was calculated by adding each rider's finishing times on each stage. The rider with the lowest cumulative time was the winner of the general classification and was considered the overall winner of the Giro. The rider leading the classification wore a pink jersey to signify the classification's leadership.

The second classification was the points classification. Riders received points for finishing in the top positions in a stage finish, with first place getting the most points, and lower placings getting successively fewer points. The rider leading this classification wore a purple (or cyclamen) jersey. The mountains classification was the third classification and its leader was denoted by the green jersey. In this ranking, points were won by reaching the summit of a climb ahead of other cyclists. Each climb was ranked as either first, second or third category, with more points available for higher category climbs.  Most stages of the race included one or more categorized climbs, in which points were awarded to the riders that reached the summit first. The Cima Coppi, the race's highest point of elevation, awarded more points than the other first category climbs. The Cima Coppi for this Giro was the Passo Pordoi, which was first crossed by Italian rider Leonardo Natale. The fourth classification, the young rider classification, was decided the same way as the general classification, but exclusive to neo-professional cyclists (in their first three years of professional racing). The leader of the classification wore a white jersey. In addition, the rider had to be aged 24 and younger.
 
The final classification, the team classification, awarded no jersey to its leaders. This was calculated by adding together points earned by each rider on the team during each stage through the intermediate sprints, the categorized climbs, stage finishes, etc. The team with the most points led the classification.

There were other minor classifications within the race, including the Campionato delle Regioni classification. The leader wore a blue jersey with colored vertical stripes ("maglia azzurra con banda tricolore verticale"). The Fiat Ritmo classification, which was created in honor Juan Manuel Santisteban who died in stage 1A of 1976 edition. The winner of the sprint in each stage received a Fiat Ritmo.

Final standings

General classification

Points classification

Mountains classification

Young rider classification

Traguardi Fiat Ritmo classification

Campionato delle Regioni classification

Team classification

References

Citations

 
Giro d'Italia by year
Giro d'Italia, 1979
Giro d'Italia, 1979
Giro d'Italia
Giro d'Italia
1979 Super Prestige Pernod